Fred Manfra (born September 1946) is an American retired sportscaster, best known for radio and television broadcasts of the Baltimore Orioles. He has covered many other sports, including football, basketball, ice hockey, horse racing and the Olympics. He retired in May 2017 as a Baltimore Orioles sportscaster.

Biography

Early life and career
A Baltimore native, Manfra is a 1964 graduate of Patterson High School, where he was inducted into its Hall of Fame in 1996. He began his broadcasting career at radio station KREL in Corona, California in the early 1970s, and gradually moved up through other jobs in Ventura, California (KBBQ-FM and KBBY-FM), Davenport, Iowa (KSTT-AM), Milwaukee (WRIT-AM), and Detroit (WWJ-AM). He also worked for the Associated Press radio sports network in Washington, D.C. before moving to New York City to begin a long stint with ABC network radio.

ABC Radio

Manfra worked for ABC for 15 years, doing many weekend sports shows. He has handled varied assignments including the NBA Finals and All-Star Game (1985–1990), Winter and Summer Olympic events, the NHL Stanley Cup Finals and All-Star Game (1991), the Breeder's Cup (2000–2002), and horse racing's triple crown races. He also broadcast college football, USFL and arena football games, New York Knicks basketball, and boxing and wrestling events. He has also called football and basketball games for the Iowa Hawkeyes and the Michigan Wolverines.

Baltimore Orioles
Manfra was hired as a play-by-play announcer for Baltimore Orioles radio broadcasts on WBAL-AM on December 16, 1992. He succeeded Joe Angel, who had moved to the expansion Florida Marlins in a similar capacity. Primarily teamed with Jon Miller for most games, Manfra also worked with Chuck Thompson whenever Miller did Orioles telecasts on WMAR or Sunday Night Baseball on ESPN. He was joined in the radio booth by Angel upon the latter's return in early-February 2004. He works innings 3, 4, 6, and 7 while Angel does the rest. He drastically cut back his assignments in 2016, and only called 10 games in the first half of the 2017 season before his retirement on June 4 of that year. Manfra was inducted into the Orioles Hall of Fame in 2018.

Personal
Manfra and his wife live in Tampa, Florida, and have two grown daughters. While working for the Orioles, he lived in Fallston, Maryland. In April 2014, Manfra underwent hip replacement surgery, and required a second operation in May. These procedures kept him out of the broadcast booth for several months of the 2014 season.

References

External links
Biography of Fred Manfra at mlb.com
1996 interview of U.S. President Bill Clinton with Jon Miller and Fred Manfra

1940s births
Living people
American horse racing announcers
American radio sports announcers
American television sports announcers
Arena football announcers
Baltimore Orioles announcers
Boxing commentators
College football announcers
College basketball announcers in the United States
Major League Baseball broadcasters
National Basketball Association broadcasters
National Hockey League broadcasters
New York Knicks announcers
People from Baltimore
United States Football League announcers
Olympic Games broadcasters
People from Fallston, Maryland